Hall Park  may refer to:

 Hall Park, Oklahoma, a neighbourhood in Norman, Oklahoma, United States
 Hall Park Academy, a secondary school in Eastwood, Nottinghamshire, England
 Hall Park Ground, a cricket ground in Horsforth, West Yorkshire, England